Geoffrey Couët (born 27 May 1988) is a French actor and comedian.

Biography 
Geoffrey Couët studied in the Cours Florent from 2006 where he attended an acting training. He won the award for best comedy actor in Rent in 2009. He is also a dancer and director. His first short film L'Extra-tragique destin des Moutardes, co-written and co-directed with Frédéric Brodard, received the Best Screenplay Award at the Short Film Festival in Troyes. He was a juror in International Short Film competition of Tel Aviv International LGBT Film Festival in 2016.

Filmography

Cinema 
 2009 : Anomymat by Christophe Karabache
 2014 : Mat by Olivier l'Inconnu
 2014 : Air conditionné by Ivan Frésard
 2014 : Saint Laurent by Bertrand Bonello
 2016 : Un homme à la hauteur by Laurent Tirard
 2016 : Père et fils, Thérapie by Émile Gaudreault
 2016 : Paris 05:59: Théo & Hugo (Théo et Hugo dans le même bateau) by Olivier Ducastel and Jacques Martineau : Théo
 2019 : The Shiny Shrimps (Les crevettes pailletées) by Cédric Le Gallo and Maxime Govare
 2021 : Down in Paris by Antony Hickling

Television 
 2014 : La Voyante by Henri Helman : Jérôme
 2015 : Camping Paradis by Philippe Proteau : Une star au camping (episode 39)
 2015 : Section de recherches by Hervé Renoh : Bachelor (episode 103)
 2015 : La Tueuse caméléon by Josée Dayan

References

External links 
 
 Geoffrey Couët
 Geoffrey Couët on Vimeo

1988 births
21st-century French comedians
21st-century French male actors
French male comedians
French male film actors
French male television actors
French LGBT comedians
French gay actors
Gay comedians
Living people
Place of birth missing (living people)